Jalil Zaidan (born 2 November 1967) is an Iraqi football goalkeeper who played for Iraq in the 1996 Asian Cup. He also played for Al-Quwa Al-Jawiya.

References

External links

Iraqi footballers
Iraq international footballers
Al-Shorta SC players
1996 AFC Asian Cup players
Living people
Association football goalkeepers
1967 births